Hilarographa hainanica is a species of moth of the family Tortricidae. It is found in Hainan, China.

The wingspan is about 12 mm. The ground colour of the forewings is glossy orange, consisting of three basal streaks and three postbasal transverse lines followed by a broad dorso-median brownish area with six orange spots. The hindwings are pale orange with brownish.

Etymology
The specific name refers to the type location, the island of Hainan.

References

Moths described in 2009
Hilarographini